Johor Port is a port in Pasir Gudang, Johor, Malaysia, built in 1977. It is an integrated multi-purpose port facility providing bulk cargo, container and general cargo services. It is the world's largest palm oil terminal and ranks third globally in terms of LME cargo volume.

History 
The Johor Port Authority was established in 1978, with the port being constructed the following year in 1979. The Johor Port Authority was incorporated in 1993, and in 1995 the port was privatized to Johor Port Berhad, which is now a wholly owned subsidiary of MMC Corporation Berhad.

Facilities and services
 8 container cranes, 5 of which are Post-Panamax 
 26 transfer cranes
 6 reach stackers
 46 prime movers 
 Dedicated rail depot, connecting to the national rail network, Singapore and Thailand
 70,000 sq. meters of warehouse space for containerized cargo

Since its inception, Johor Port has been handling liquid bulk cargo. Specifically, it provides facilities for edible oils - primarily palm and soybean oils - and petroleum products. The port has a freshwater capacity of 1.9 million liters to supply ships, which is done through hydrants on the wharves and the breasting island of the oil jetty. 

For its bulk and break bulk operations, Johor Port has berths with an overall length of almost 2.4 km and nearly 200,000 sq. meters of storage facilities. Its gantry crane and the Impsamade level-stuffing crane can handle 800 tons per hour; the two wharf-side cranes can handle 400 tons per hour. Johor Port's terminal has 72,000 tons of covered storage space for edible cargo and 87,000 tons of covered space for non-edible products. A conveyor system allows cargo to be transported directly from ships to nearby warehouses. 

Johor Port's 2008 activities were as follows:
 Liquid bulk: 40%
 Dry bulk: 14%
 General cargo (breakbulk): 8%
 Container: 38%

Logistics subsidiaries
Johor Port Berhad operates two logistics subsidiaries at the port:

JP Logistics SDN BHD
JP Logistics (JPL) was established in 1996 as a wholly owned subsidiary, designed to handle the port's internal haulage and storage needs and provide logistics services across Malaysia and into neighboring Singapore. It also has operations in the Port of Tanjung Pelepas (PTP). JPL handles both full container loads (FCL) and less-than-container loads (LCL) shipments.

Bernas Logistics Sdn Bhd

Bernas Logistics (BLSB) is the logistics arm of Bernas, the national rice distributor, with a majority stake owned by Johor Port Berhad.

See also
 Transport in Malaysia

References

External links
 Johor Port Official Website
 Johor Port Authority Official Website
 port-technology.com
 The Malaysian Maritime Cyber Hub

1977 establishments in Malaysia
Pasir Gudang
 South Johor Economic Region